Nobodies may refer to:

 The Nobodys (band), a Californian band
 The Nobodies (novel), a 2005 fantasy novel by N. E. Bode
 The Nobodies (song), a song from Marilyn Manson's 2000 album Holy Wood (In the Shadow of the Valley of Death)
Nobodies (TV series), an American comedy television series

See also
 Nobody (disambiguation)